Chambon-Sainte-Croix is a commune in the Creuse department in the Nouvelle-Aquitaine region in central France.

Geography
The Petite Creuse river forms the northern and eastern borders of the commune.

Population

Sights
 The church of St. Croix, dating from the eleventh century.

See also
Communes of the Creuse department

References

Communes of Creuse